Hengshan, also known as Mount Heng, is a mountain in southcentral China's Hunan Province known as the southern mountain of the Five Great Mountains of China.

At the foot of the mountain stands the largest temple in southern China, the Grand Temple of Mount Heng (Nanyue Damiao), which is the largest group of ancient buildings in Hunan Province.

Other notable sites in the area include Shangfeng Temple, Fuyan Temple, Zhusheng Temple (8th-century Buddhist monastery) and Zhurong Gong, a small stone temple.

Climate

References

Further reading 

 
 

Heng
Heng
Tourist attractions in Hunan
Heng
Hengshan
Heng